Gang Min-hyeok (born 29 October 1981) is a South Korean alpine skier. He competed at the 2002 Winter Olympics and the 2006 Winter Olympics.

References

External links
 

1981 births
Living people
South Korean male alpine skiers
Olympic alpine skiers of South Korea
Alpine skiers at the 2002 Winter Olympics
Alpine skiers at the 2006 Winter Olympics
Place of birth missing (living people)
Asian Games medalists in alpine skiing
Asian Games silver medalists for South Korea
Alpine skiers at the 2003 Asian Winter Games
Alpine skiers at the 2007 Asian Winter Games
Medalists at the 2007 Asian Winter Games
Dankook University alumni
21st-century South Korean people